WWE Crown Jewel is a professional wrestling event produced by WWE, an American-based promotion. It is broadcast live and available only through pay-per-view (PPV) and the livestreaming services Peacock and the WWE Network. Established in 2018, the event has been held every year since except in 2020, which was due to the COVID-19 pandemic that year, and it is held in late October—early November. It is WWE's main recurring event that takes place in Saudi Arabia as part of a 10-year partnership in support of Saudi Vision 2030; the inaugural Crown Jewel was the second event in this partnership. The event's name is a reference to it taking place in Riyadh, the capital of Saudi Arabia.

History 

In early 2018, the American professional wrestling promotion WWE began a 10-year strategic multiplatform partnership with the General Sports Authority in support of Saudi Vision 2030, Saudi Arabia's social and economic reform program. The first pay-per-view (PPV) and WWE Network event under this partnership, the Greatest Royal Rumble, was held at the King Abdullah Sports City's King Abdullah International Stadium in Jeddah on April 27, 2018. A follow-up was held on November 2 titled Crown Jewel, which was held at the King Saud University Stadium in Riyadh, the capital of Saudi Arabia; the show was headlined by the first (and so far only) "WWE World Cup" tournament, and a tag team match between D-Generation X (Shawn Michaels and Triple H) and The Brothers of Destruction (Kane and The Undertaker). 

A second Crown Jewel event was then held the following year on October 31, 2019, at the King Fahd International Stadium, also in Riyadh, thus establishing Crown Jewel as a recurring event for the Saudi Arabian partnership, and specifically, a recurring event in Riyadh. Because of COVID-19 pandemic-related regulations, a Crown Jewel was not held in 2020; however, the event returned in 2021 and took place on October 21 at the Mohammed Abdu Arena on the Boulevard in Riyadh. The 2021 event was also the first Crown Jewel to air on Peacock's WWE Network channel, following the merger of the American version of the WWE Network under Peacock in March that year. 

On May 23, 2022, WWE announced that the 2022 Crown Jewel would be held on Saturday, November 5. The event was held at Mrsool Park, marking the second Crown Jewel to be held at this venue after the inaugural 2018 event, which was held there when it was previously referred to as King Saud University Stadium; the stadium's name was changed to Mrsool Park in 2020.

Events 

Notes

See also
 WWE in Saudi Arabia

References

Recurring events established in 2018
WWE pay-per-view events
WWE international